Víctor Sada Remisa (born 8 March 1984), commonly known as Víctor Sada, is a Spanish former professional basketball player. He is a 1.92 m (6 ft 3¾ in) tall point guard. He is right-handed.

Professional career
Sada joined the Spanish ACB League club FC Barcelona's senior team during the 2003-04 season. He then moved to Girona in 2006. He returned to FC Barcelona in 2008.

National team career
Sada has also been a member of the senior men's Spain national team. He played at the EuroBasket 2011 and won a silver medal at the 2012 Summer Olympics.

Honors

FC Barcelona

Spanish League (5): 2003–04, 2008–09, 2010–11, 2011–12, 2013–14
Spanish King's Cups (3): 2010, 2011, 2013
Spanish Super Cups (4): 2004, 2009, 2010, 2011
EuroLeague (1): 2009–10

CB Girona

FIBA EuroCup (1): 2007

Spanish team

 EuroBasket (1): 2011

References

External links
 Euroleague.net Profile
 Eurobasket.com Profile
 Spanish League Profile  

1984 births
Living people
Basketball players at the 2012 Summer Olympics
BC Andorra players
Spanish expatriate basketball people in Andorra
Basketball players from Catalonia
CB Girona players
FC Barcelona Bàsquet players
FC Barcelona Bàsquet B players
Liga ACB players
Medalists at the 2012 Summer Olympics
Olympic basketball players of Spain
Olympic medalists in basketball
Olympic silver medalists for Spain
People from Badalona
Sportspeople from the Province of Barcelona
Point guards
Spanish men's basketball players